Sara Caldwell (born Sara Chapin Coover; 1961 in New York City) is an American author and screenwriter/filmmaker. She was founder and producer/writer of Amphion Productions from 1991 to 2006 and is currently a co-producer and writer for House of Gorey Productions.

Early life and education
The daughter of writer Robert Coover, and Spanish needlepoint artist Pilar Sans Coover, Sara Caldwell lived in many different locations when growing up, both small towns and large cities in Guatemala, Spain, England, and various parts of the United States. She attended the progressive boarding school, Dartington Hall School, in Totnes, England. Returning to America at the age of 17, she pursued a bachelor's degree in Communications from the University of Iowa, where she was a member of the undergraduate Iowa Writers Workshop.

Career
After graduation, Caldwell moved to Chicago, Illinois to work as a producer/writer.

Whilst in Chicago, she became involved with an inner city tutoring program, resulting in the production of her first documentary, 'Cabrini Green... what you don't see' which aired on the Chicago PBS station. She eventually became an original founder and board director for the Tutor/Mentor Connection.

Caldwell moved to Washington, D.C. in 1989 to work for WORLDNET Television and Film Service, a division of United States Information Agency. Here, she was a writer/producer for live interactive broadcasts to Africa, East Asia, and the Middle East. She then worked at Motion Masters in Charleston, West Virginia for six months before returning to Chicago in 1991 to form Amphion Productions. She then worked as a freelance writer/producer on hundreds of projects and was a 1997 competition winner for the Chicago/Illinois Screenplay Contest. She moved her company to Los Angeles in 1998 and has since written three books on screenwriting/film production topics. She is also a professor of film/screenwriting courses at College of the Canyons  in Santa Clarita, California and the Fashion Institute of Design and Merchandizing (FIDM) in Los Angeles. In 2010, she partnered with her husband Walter Gorey to form House of Gorey Productions.

In 2018, she penned her first young adult novel, Raven Dock, to be published by White Bird Publications. The novel is part of a series known as Dark Coven. She also co-wrote/produced/directed the YouTube comedy web series, BOOMERS.

Personal life
Caldwell lives in Valencia, California.

Awards
Gorey Productions and Caldwell's screenplays have won awards including:

Screenplay awards
Winner, Best Original Screenplay – Burbank International Film Festival 
Best Screenplay – Shivers International Film Festival 
1st Place, Horror Category – Cannes Screenplay Contest 
Best Screenplay – Dazed4Horror Film Festival, Bay City, Texas

Short film awards
Best Short Film – Indie Horror Film Festival, Gatlinburg, Tennessee
Best Short Horror Film – Los Angeles Independent Film Festival
Best Short Horror Film, Best Director – Creative Arts Film Festival
Best Short Film – Los Angeles Thriller Film Festival
Audience Choice Award – Haunted Horror Film Festival, Freeport, Texas

Selected works

Books
Raven Dock: Dark Coven Series (Austin, TX: White Bird Publications, 2018)
Splatter Flicks: How to Make Low-Budget Horror Films (New York: Allworth Press, 2006)
Jump-start your Awesome Film Company (New York: Allworth Press, 2005)
(with Maria-Eve Kielson) So You Want To Be A Screenwriter (New York: Allworth Press, 2000)

References

External links

Website of House of Gorey Productions
Interview with Sara Caldwell on her book 'Splatter Flicks'
Review of 'Splatter Flicks'

1961 births
Living people
University of Iowa alumni
American women screenwriters
Iowa Writers' Workshop alumni
Writers from New York City
People educated at Dartington Hall School
People from Valencia, Santa Clarita, California
Screenwriters from California
Screenwriters from New York (state)
American expatriates in England
20th-century American women writers
21st-century American women writers
People of the United States Information Agency